Per Hallberg (born December 30, 1958), is a Swedish film sound editor whose work has appeared in over 40 movies. He has won three Academy Awards for Best Sound Editing
for the films Braveheart (1995), The Bourne Ultimatum (2007) and Skyfall (2012). He was also nominated for the award for Face/Off (1997).

Hallberg works for the notable Hollywood sound post production company Soundelux.

He often works with Karen Baker Landers.

References

External links 

 Mix Magazine article on American Gangster

1958 births
Living people
Swedish editors
Sound editors
Best Sound Editing Academy Award winners
Best Sound BAFTA Award winners